Udaan may refer to:

Udaan (1997 film), a Hindi film
Udaan (2010 film), a Hindi film
Udaan (album), by Nepali singer Shweta Punjali (2015)
Udaan (1989 TV series), DD National TV show
Udaan (2014 TV series), Colors TV show
Udaan Trust, Indian non-governmental organisation
Udaan Campaign, an India government programme to support disadvantaged girls  for admission to engineering colleges in India
 Udaan, the Hindi-dubbed version of the Tamil film Soorarai Pottru